The 2015 FINA Women's Water Polo World League is played between November 2014 and June 2015 and open to all women's water polo national teams. After participating in a preliminary round, eight teams qualify to play in a final tournament, called the Super Final in Shanghai, China from 09–14 June 2015.

In the world league, there are specific rules that do not allow matches to end in a draw.  If teams are level at the end of the 4th quarter of any world league match, the match will be decided by a penalty shootout. Teams earn points in the standings in group matches as follows:
 Match won in normal time - 3 points
 Match won in shootout - 2 points
 Match lost in shootout - 1 point
 Match lost in normal time - 0 points

Europe

Preliminary round
The European preliminary round consisted of two group of four teams. The winner of each group after the home and away series of games qualified for the Super Final.

Group A

Group B

Intercontinental Qualification Tournament

Preliminary round

Group A

Group B

Knockout stage

Quarterfinals

Semifinals

3rd Place

Final

5th-8th Places

5th-8th Places Semifinals

7th Place

5th Place

Super Final
In the Super Final the eight qualifying teams are split into two groups of four teams with all teams progressing to the knock-out stage. The games were played in Shanghai, China from 9 to 14 June 2015.

Preliminary round

Group A

Group B

Knockout stage

Quarterfinals

5th-8th Places

5th-8th Places Semifinals

7th Place

5th Place

Finals

Semifinals

3rd Place

Final

Final ranking 

Team Roster
Sami Hill, Maddie Musselman, Melissa Seidemann, Rachel Fattal, Caroline Clark, Maggie Steffens (C), Courtney Mathewson,  Kiley Neushul, Ashley Grossman, Kaleigh Gilchrist , Makenzie Fischer, Kami Craig, Ashleigh Johnson. Head coach: Adam Krikorian.

References

World League, women
2015
International water polo competitions hosted by China